Gun laws in Kuwait include stringent gun control. The law does allow firearms to be licensed under specific conditions and regulations:

 Kuwaiti (or have an exception from Minister of Interior to own)
 Age must be above 25 years old and fully capable of handling a weapon.
 Must have no criminal records.
 Must not be a suspect or under police surveillance.
 Must have an occupation or a source of living (must not be homeless or have no source of income).
 Application should be submitted to the minister by the criminal investigation.

Usually hunting shotguns are the most common licensed weapons in Kuwait also the easiest to get it licensed, hunting and sniper rifles are more difficult to be licensed but firearms chambered for .22 LR are more commonly licensed, whether with threaded or unthreaded barrel

Automatic rifles or machine guns are not allowed to be licensed in Kuwait but many houses do have such illegal weapons that are either taken by the Kuwaiti resistance  of the Iraqi invasion in 1990 or taken during the end of Gulf War when the Iraqi army retreated.

References

Kuwait
Law of Kuwait
Society of Kuwait